Laura Lemay (born August 1, 1967) is an American author of technical books, most notably starting the SAMS Publishing "Teach Yourself" series.

Biography
Lemay works as a freelance technical writer. Beginning in the 1990s, she authored a series of instructional texts on web publishing, HTML, and Java. Her first book, Teach Yourself Web Publishing with HTML in a Week, demonstrated that HTML could be learned easily and was the second guide on HTML to appear on the market. Her second book, Teach Yourself Java in 21 Days, promised to do the same for prospective Java users, and her 1997 book The Official Guide to Marimba's Castanet focused on push media. 1997's Laura Lemay's Web Workshop: Javascript received positive reviews, and was praised as a "fine book" that came with helpful software.

Andrew Leonard, writing for Salon.com, noted that Lemay's books (by the time of his 1997 article he counted 23) were an example of "Beta books", books about software that come bundled with software, and are regularly updated.

Personal life
Lemay lives in the Santa Cruz hills with her husband Eric. On December 19th, 2022, she announced on her blog lauralemay.com that she had throat cancer.

Books
 2010 – Sams Teach Yourself Web Publishing with HTML and CSS in One Hour a Day, Sixth Edition – 
 2007 – Sams Teach Yourself Java 6 in 21 Days – 
 2006 – Sams Teach Yourself Web Publishing with HTML and CSS in One Hour a Day – 
 2004 – Sams Teach Yourself Java 2 in 21 Days – 
 2003 – Sams Teach Yourself Web Publishing with HTML & XHTML in 21 Days – 
 2003 – Sams Teach Yourself Web Publishing With HTML and XHTML – 
 2002 – Sams Teach Yourself Perl in 21 Days – 
 2001 – Sams Teach Yourself Web Publishing with HTML and XHTML in 21 Days, Professional Reference Edition – 
 2000 – Sams Teach Yourself Web Publishing with HTML 4 in 21 Days, Professional Reference Edition, Second Edition – 
 1999 – Sams Teach Yourself Java 2 Platform in 21 Days: Complete Compiler Edition – 
 1998 – Sams Teach Yourself Java 1.2 in 21 Days Complete Compiler Edition – 
 1998 – Sams Teach Yourself Java 1.2 in 21 Days – 
 1998 – Web Publishing With HTML 4 in a Week: Complete Starter Kit – 
 1997 – Sams Teach Yourself Java 1.1 in 21 Days – 
 1997 – Teach Yourself Web Publishing With HTML in a Week – 
 1997 – Laura Lemay's Web Workshop: Designing With Stylesheets, Tables, and Frames – 
 1997 – Sams Teach Yourself Web Publishing With HTML 3.2 In14 Days – 
 1997 – Laura Lemay's Electronic Web Workshop – 
 1997 – Teach Yourself Java 1.1 in 21 Days – 
 1997 – Laura Lemay's Java 1.1 Interactive Course – 
 1997 – Laura Lemay's Guide to Sizzling Web Site Design – 
 1997 – Official Marimba Guide to Castanet – 
 1997 – Teach Yourself Web Publishing With HTML 3.2 in 14 Days: Second Professional Reference Edition – 
 1997 – Aprendiendo HTML Para Web En Una Semana (Paperback) – 
 1997 – Teach Yourself Java 1.1 In 21 Days – 
 1996 – Teach Yourself Web Publishing With HTML 3.0 in a Week – 
 1996 – Teach Yourself Java in 21 Days: Professional Reference Edition – 
 1996 – Teach Yourself Visual J++ in 21 Days – 
 1996 – Teach Yourself Sunsoft Java Workshop in 21 Days – 
 1996 – Creating Commercial Web Pages – 
 1996 – Teach Yourself Web Publishing With HTML 3.2 in a Week – 
 1996 – Graphics & Web Page Design – 
 1996 – Laura Lemay's Web Workshop Javascript – 
 1996 – Laura Lemay's Web Workshop: 3D Graphics & VRML 2.0 – 
 1996 – Laura Lemay's Web Workshop: Microsoft Frontpage – 
 1996 – Laura Lemay's Web Workshop: Netscape Navigator Gold 3 – 
 1996 – Teach Yourself Cafe in 21 Days – 
 1996 – Teach Yourself Web Publishing With HTML 3.2 in 14 Days: Premier Edition – 
 1996 – Teach Yourself Java for Macintosh in 21 Days – 
 1996 – Web Design Electronic Resource Kit – 
 1996 – Web Publishing Electronic Resource Kit – 
 1996 – Teach Yourself Java in 21 Days – 
 1995 – Complete Teach Yourself HTML Kit – 
 1995 – Teach Yourself Web Publishing in 14 Days – 
 1995 – Teach Yourself More Web Publishing With HTML in a Week –

References

External links
Official website

1967 births
Living people
American bloggers
American technology writers
Women technology writers
21st-century American non-fiction writers
American women bloggers
21st-century American women writers